Life of Riley is a 2010 play by Alan Ayckbourn. It was first performed at the Stephen Joseph Theatre, Scarborough.

Structure

It is set over a period over the seven months that a man called George Riley is diagnosed with a terminal illness, although George Riley does not appear in the play himself and is only ever referred to by the six onstage characters.

This play is the only Ayckbourn play to directly reference another Ayckbourn play (Relatively Speaking) within the story.

Characters

 George Riley (unseen)
 Colin
 Kathryn 
 Jack
 Tamsin
 Monica - Riley's ex-wife
 Simeon
 Small boy (unseen)
 Teenage daughter (unseen)
 Basil Bender (unseen)

Adaptation into film

The play was filmed by the French director Alain Resnais, as Aimer, boire et chanter (2014).

References

External links
 Life of Riley on official Ayckbourn site

2010 plays
Plays by Alan Ayckbourn